Dundee Football Club is a professional football club based in the city of Dundee, Scotland, founded in 1893. The team are nicknamed "The Dark Blues" or "The Dee". The club plays its home matches at Dens Park.

The club was formed after a merger between clubs Dundee East End and Dundee Our Boys in order to apply for the SFL. Within a decade they had become a major force in Scottish football, finishing as league runners-up three times in the 1900s, and finished the decade as Scottish Cup winners in 1910. They remained a major side in Scottish football before a decline in the 1930s. After the return to football in the aftermath of the Second World War, the club experienced a revival in the late 1940s and 1950s under George Anderson with another runners-up finish and consecutive Scottish League Cup wins in 1952 and 1953.

The club's most successful era was in the 1960s when, under the management of Bob Shankly, Dundee won the Scottish Football League title in 1962, before reaching the semi-finals of the 1962–63 European Cup the following season. The club again won the League Cup in the 1973–1974 season, but since that time has won no further major honour. Since the late 1970s the club has experienced issues with frequent relegations and financial issues, though has found stability in the latter as of late.

The club has a long-standing rivalry with fellow Dundee side Dundee United, which is situated on the same street. It is the most local football derby in Great Britain. Matches between the two are called the Dundee derby, and games are fiercely contested and are often considered one of the most exciting fixtures in Scottish football. Despite this, the rivalry is much friendlier than other Scottish derbies such as the Old Firm, with families often split down the middle in terms of support.

History

Late 19th and early 20th century
Dundee F.C. was formed in 1893 by the merger of two local clubs, East End and Our Boys, with the intention of gaining election to the Scottish Football League (SFL). Their application was successful and they played their first League game on 12 August 1893 at West Craigie Park, securing a 3–3 draw against Rangers. Dundee struggled during the first 10 years of their existence. Their best league position was fifth which they achieved in seasons 1895–96 and 1896–97. They also reached the semi-finals of the Scottish Cup in 1894–95 and 1897–98, losing to Renton and Kilmarnock respectively. On 26 October 1895 Dundee lost a league game by a club record score of 0–11 to Celtic in Glasgow. On 1 January 1894 Dundee defeated Newton Heath (the future Manchester United) 2–1 at their then Carolina Port ground in Dundee. Carolina Port also hosted the first international football match held in Dundee on 21 March 1896 when Scotland defeated Wales 4–0. Dundee's goalkeeper Frank Barrett, midfielder Sandy Keillor and inside-forward Bill Thomson were all capped for Scotland during this early period of the club's history. Things began to improve for Dundee with the beginning of the new century. In 1899 they moved from Carolina Port to their present ground of Dens Park. In season 1902–1903 they finished runners-up in the league championship to Hibernian. (In season 1902–1903 Dundee allowed 12 league goals against, which remains the fewest goals conceded by any British club in a full league season.)

Dundee were also league runners-up in 1906–1907 and 1908–1909 finishing behind Celtic on both occasions, in 1908–1909 by just 1 point. In the 10 seasons from 1902 to 1903 Dundee lost just 16 league games at Dens Park out of 154 played and were unbeaten at home during season 1909–1910. Although ultimate success eluded Dundee in the league the club achieved success in the Scottish Cup. In season 1909–1910 Dundee won their first trophy by defeating Clyde in the Scottish Cup Final. (Dundee took three games to beat Hibernian in the semi-final and then the same number to defeat Clyde.) The winning goal in the second replay was scored by John 'Sailor' Hunter. In season 1910–1911 Dundee defeated Rangers 2–1 at Dens Park in the Scottish Cup quarter-final but lost to Hamilton in the semi-final. The beginning of the First World War and the call-up of many players for military duty drastically curtailed football in Britain from 1914 and in 1917 Dundee and Aberdeen were both asked to withdraw from the league due to increasing transport costs for the other league clubs. In 1919 league football recommenced and good home form once again propelled Dundee up the league. They finished fourth in seasons 1919–1920, 1920–1921 and 1921–1922, and were unbeaten at home during season 1921–1922. However, they could not make the breakthrough to win the league championship.

Dave Halliday had played on the left wing for his previous clubs – St Mirren and his hometown side Queen of the South. He went to Dundee in 1921, where Scotland internationalist Alec Troup played left wing. Dundee thus converted Halliday to centre forward with spectacular results; he finished as Scottish top scorer in the 1923–1924 season with 38 goals from his 36 top division appearances. This remains the club record all-time league goalscoring record for a single season. (Later, Halliday top-scored in England's top division in 1928–29, to become the most recent of only two players to be outright top scorer in Scotland and England). With Halliday, Dundee reached the 1924–25 Scottish Cup final, en route eliminating the holders, the Airdrieonians side of Hughie Gallacher. Dundee led Celtic 1–0 at half time in the final before losing out to a last-minute Jimmy McGrory winner. Halliday top-scored for Dundee in that cup run. In end-of-season tours with Dundee, he scored doubles against each of Athletic Bilbao, Real Madrid, Valencia CF and FC Barcelona. He scored 103 goals in 147 league and cup appearances for the Dee. He then moved south to set scoring records in England, where other teams profited from Dundee's decision to convert Halliday to centre-forward.

Mid-20th century

The post-Second World War period was a golden era for Dundee Football Club. Having been relegated on the eve of war, the Dark Blues started in 1946 in the first official season in the second tier but within five years they were runners-up in the Scottish League Championship and won their first trophy in forty-one years.

Back-to-back 'B' Division titles earned George Anderson's Dundee promotion in 1947, and just two years later they were within a whisker of becoming champions of Scotland. Silverware was not far away; after spending a world record transfer fee of £23,500 on Billy Steel (much to the chagrin of some supporters of the club – who resented the aspect of finance in football, and instead wished for 'homegrown' talent), they won the Scottish League Cup in 1951 in one of the most exciting finals Hampden has ever seen.

Twelve months later the team were back at Hampden to become the first side to retain the League Cup, and in between these two victories appeared in the 1952 Scottish Cup Final. The Dark Blue side of the era included players such as Bill Brown, Tommy Gallacher, Doug Cowie, Alfie Boyd, Bobby Flavell and Billy Steel.

In the 1958–59 Scottish Cup Dundee suffered a shock 1–0 defeat to Highland League side Fraserburgh. This is widely regarded as Dundee's most embarrassing defeat in their history.

1960s – Dundee's golden age
Bob Shankly (brother of Bill Shankly) was appointed manager in 1959. Dundee became champions of Scotland when they won the Division One league title in the 1961–1962 season. With players such as Bobby Cox, Bobby Wishart, Pat Liney, Alan Cousin, Andy Penman, Hugh Robertson, Alan Gilzean, Alex Hamilton, Bobby Seith, Gordon Smith and Ian Ure they clinched the title with a win against St Johnstone, which in turn relegated St Johnstone to the then Second Division. Gordon Smith earned the distinction of being the only player to win the Scottish football championship with three clubs (Hibs, Hearts and Dundee), none of them either half of the traditionally dominant Old Firm.

The following season, 1962–1963, Dundee reached the semi-finals of the European Cup beating 1. FC Köln, Sporting Clube de Portugal and R.S.C. Anderlecht. Dundee lost to A.C. Milan on aggregate in the semi-finals, though they won (and kept a clean sheet) against Milan in the home leg at Dens Park.

The Dee reached the Scottish Cup final again in the 1963–1964 competition. Shankly left Dundee in February 1965.

The next manager after Shankly was former player Bobby Ancell from the 1947 B Division Championship side. Ancell took Dundee to a 1967–68 League Cup final against the previous season's European Cup winners, Celtic. Ancell's team scored three times at Hampden Park in Glasgow but still lost 5–3.

In the predecessor to the UEFA Cup/Europa League, Dundee reached the semi-finals of the 1967–68 Inter-Cities Fairs Cup. Dundee eliminated opposition from the Netherlands, Belgium and Switzerland to meet Leeds United in the semi-final. After a 1–1 draw at Dens, a 1–0 second leg win took Leeds through.

Late 20th century
In 1973, under the management of David White and captaincy of Tommy Gemmell, the League Cup returned to Dens following a 1–0 win against Celtic.

In 1986, Dundee secured a 2–0 victory over Hearts at Dens Park on the final day of the season to deny the Edinburgh club their first league title in 26 years. Hearts had managed to stay unbeaten in the league since 28 September 1985, and simply had to continue this run for one more game to finish top of the table; however, two late goals from substitute Albert Kidd, coupled with Celtic's 5–0 victory at St Mirren, ensured that the league championship went to Glasgow.

21st century
In 2000 the club hit the headlines when it signed Argentine international Claudio Caniggia, who later signed for Rangers. Caniggia was only one of many foreign signings in the Dundee side in the early 2000s, which also included former Newcastle United player Temuri Ketsbaia. The signing of such high-profile players, along with many others, led Dundee to a Scottish Cup final and two top-six finishes. This was achieved firstly under the managership of Ivano Bonetti (who also made a short but notable playing contribution, linking up well with Caniggia) and then under Jim Duffy. Attendances were still short of the hoped-for numbers, and with spending significantly outweighing income, Dundee was soon forced into administration.

Before Dundee entered financial trouble, the team knocked out Glasgow side Partick Thistle 2–0 away from home in the third round of the Scottish Cup in 2003. The fourth round saw Dundee knock out Aberdeen 2–0 at Dens Park. Dundee continued their march towards Hampden Park with a 1–1 draw away and a 4–1 extra time victory over Falkirk at Dens booked their place in the semi-finals playing Inverness CT at Hampden Park. A goal by Georgi Nemsadze secured a 1–0 victory and a place in the Final against Rangers. In the final Barry Smith hit the post for Dundee but Lorenzo Amoruso scored to bring Dundee's cup run to an end.

That year, due to the club's failure to sell on players as anticipated insufficient income was raised to fund the large wage bill under owners Peter and James Marr, resulting in a £23m debt which meant they were forced to go into administration with many players such as Fabian Caballero, Craig Burley and Georgian captain Giorgi Nemsadze leaving in 2005. Despite this huge debt, Dundee survived by selling their stadium in 2003. But the club was then relegated to the second tier of the Scottish leagues, where they remained until July 2012. In mid-2006, it was announced that financial restructuring would see the club become debt-free.

In 2007, James and Peter Marr severed some of their ties with Dundee, stepping down as chairman and Chief Executive respectively, when their company P&J Taverns was forced into administration. Bob Brannan and Dave MacKinnon took the Marrs' place.

In 2008, after a poor run in the league, manager Alex Rae was sacked, with former manager Jocky Scott taking over for his third stint with the club.

In the 2009–10 season Dundee director Calum Melville was in trouble for claiming he was going to offer rivals Dundee United £500,000 for ex-Dundee midfielder Scott Robertson. Dundee won the Challenge Cup Final when they beat Inverness Caledonian Thistle 3–2.

In March 2010, Scott was sacked as manager after a 3–0 defeat by Airdrie United. He was replaced by Gordon Chisholm, with Billy Dodds as his assistant.

In September 2010, Dundee were again on the brink of going into administration due to a £365,000 unpaid tax bill. During negotiations with HM Revenue & Customs, the club's offer to pay £100,000 immediately was rejected. On 14 September it was announced that the club would be going into administration. As punishment for entering administration the Scottish Football League docked Dundee 25 points on 1 November 2010. At the time the punishment was imposed, this left Dundee bottom of the First Division table with −11 points, 20 points behind the second-bottom team. On 10 December 2010 the Dark Blues Business Trust was set up by former Dundee owner Peter Marr and former director Steve Martin to help the club recover from their financial situation. On 17 December 2010 Dundee's appeal against the points deduction was rejected. Dundee went on a 23 match undefeated streak in the first division beating the previous record set by the team.

On 12 May 2011, Dundee FC exited administration. The club's supporters' trust, Dundee FC Supporters' Society Ltd., became the majority shareholder, and Steve Martin of the DFC Business Trust joined the board of directors along with 5 of the Society Fans board.

On 6 November 2011, it was announced Harry MacLean had resigned from his position as Chief Executive and would work a month's notice. MacLean, who had played a key role in saving the club during administration, accepted an invitation to re-join the club in a non-executive role before departing his position as Chief Executive. His resignation was followed just eleven days later by Stuart Murphy's decision to step down as club chairman and Director of the Club which was effective immediately. On 27 December 2011, Harry MacLean resigned from his non-executive role causing questions to arise about the stability of the boardroom. Shortly after the gap left by MacLean was filled by Scot Gardiner.

On 16 July 2012, Dundee were invited to join the Scottish Premier League to replace Rangers after their liquidation and subsequent admittance to the fourth tier of Scottish football.

Since the second period of administration, Dundee, along with their Supporters' Society, implemented regular KPI targets. These targets were set to ensure, in some part, that the failures that led to administration and indeed, several decades of financial turmoil, could not be repeated. Dundee were left after the second administration with only footballing debt and no borrowing capability. Since exiting administration, the club has focussed on honouring the footballing debt, whilst keeping lower football wages and stadium bills, according to the income generated. The debt post-admin was unexpectedly still over £200,000 which had to be quickly worked into the board's already stretched budgets.

After an unsuccessful season in the Premier League, when they were asked to replace Rangers, Dundee were again relegated after finishing bottom, despite vastly improved form after John Brown replaced Barry Smith as manager toward the end of the season. The following season (2013–14) Dundee would take part in the Scottish Championship (formerly the First Division) after reforms were made to the Scottish League system.

FPS ownership 
Throughout the summer leading up to the start of the 2013–14 season talks were held regarding a possible Texan based takeover with investments to be made of up to £650,000. The takeover was completed and former Director Bill Colvin was appointed as chairman to oversee this new board of which main investor Tim Keyes of Keyes Capital, Austin, Texas, appointed John Nelms to look after his interests. The 2013–14 season proved to be one to remember with Dundee clinching the title and promotion to the top tier on the last day of the season with a 2–1 win over Dumbarton. After a heavy defeat to Falkirk and a draw against Alloa, manager John Brown was replaced by Paul Hartley. A 3–0 win at Alloa for The Dark Blues and a 4–1 loss to Dumbarton for Hamilton Academical meant that Dundee were in the driving seat when it came to the finale. Dens Park was sold out for the game against Dumbarton when Christian Nade headed in the opening goal. Soon after, Peter MacDonald scored the second goal. The away side pulled a goal back in the second half and Hamilton Academical managed to close the goal difference with a 10–2 victory over Greenock Morton. But Dundee got the three points, and clinched promotion to the Scottish Premiership.

Paul Hartley was quick in the transfer window for the following season, bringing in no fewer than twelve new players, to rebuild the squad for top-flight football, having already signed Greg Stewart on a pre-contract from Cowdenbeath and Philip Roberts who joined before the end of May. Released Hibernian players James McPake and Kevin Thomson were next to join, along with Alloa goalkeeper Scott Bain. Thomson was made Captain after signing. Simon Ferry, released from Portsmouth then returned to his hometown to play for Dundee. Paul McGowan and Paul McGinn arrived from St Mirren and Dumbarton respectfully, then attacking midfielder Gary Harkins signed for his third spell at the club on the last day of June, after also being released from St Mirren. A number of first team players departed, namely Christian Nade and Ryan Conroy, who both went on to join Raith Rovers, Gavin Rae who retired from playing and player-coach Matt Lockwood.

On the opening day of the 2014–2015 season, Dundee recorded a 1–1 draw against Kilmarnock at home, Gary Harkins put Dundee ahead from the spot after Kilmarnock conceded a penalty, with Craig Slater equalising for the visitors from a well struck free-kick on the edge of the Dundee area. Dundee won their first game of the 2014–2015 season on 23 August with a 1–0 win over St Mirren away from home, a 79th-minute goal from Peter MacDonald securing the win, making them unbeaten in their first four league games of the season. Dundee also started the League Cup well with two 4–0 wins on the bounce over Peterhead and Raith Rovers.

Dundee managed to gain a top six place by mid-April thus securing their position in the Premiership for 2015–16 campaign. They secured the place for definite after Kilmarnock were defeated 2–1 by Aberdeen on 12 April and a Dundee derby victory on 8 April in a 3–1 Win at home to Dundee United.

At the end of the 2014–15 season, in June, Dundee chairman Bill Colvin stepped down as chairman and sold his share in Dundee to then director, Tim Keyes who became the new chairman of the club.

Dundee finished eighth in the 2015–16 Scottish Premiership, notably relegating rivals Dundee United at Dens Park.

Dundee were relegated to the Scottish Championship at the end of the 2018–2019 season. Manager Jim McIntyre and assistant manager Jimmy Boyle were sacked on 12 May. After playing the role of interim manager in Dundee's final home game, former player James McPake was hired as manager on a permanent basis, with Jimmy Nicholl, then current assistant manager of Northern Ireland, brought in as assistant manager. The club would finish the season (prematurely ended due to the COVID-19 pandemic) in third place, and the following season would finish as runners-up. In the Premiership play-offs, Dundee would defeat Raith Rovers and Premiership side Kilmarnock to earn promotion back into the top flight after two seasons.

Stadium

Since 1899, Dundee have played their home matches at Dens Park which has a capacity of 11,775. Uniquely, the stadium shares part of the same road (Sandeman Street) as Tannadice Park, which is the home of city rivals Dundee United.

In 2002, plans were drawn up for a new stadium to be built in the city as part of Scotland's bid to host the 2008 European Football Championship. This stadium would have been shared by Dundee and near-neighbours Dundee United, which would have required the two to leave their historic grounds at Dens Park and Tannadice Stadium respectively.  However, when Ukraine and Poland were selected to co-host the event, the plans were shelved for the immediate future.

In May 2009, it was reported that the stadium is owned by local businessman John Bennett who, despite having invested heavily in Dundee, had rejoined the Dundee United board, where he had previously been a director until September 2008.

In October 2014, Dundee Supporter's Society announced they had put forward plans to then club chairman, Bill Colvin which would allow the club to buy back the stadium from current owner John Bennett. They also expressed this was not a plan to enable the Supporter's Society to own the Stadium but for the club themselves, and that they will "simply administer the scheme".

In April 2015, Colvin announced that negotiations were taking place to buy back the Stadium from current owner John Bennett and his company Sandeman Holdings.

In August 2016, club owners Tim Keyes and John Nelms were reported to have bought land in the Camperdown area of Dundee, next to the city's Ice Arena. It was then made clear in February 2017 that the plan for this land was to develop a new stadium for the club due to the increasing maintenance costs of Dens Park, although plans for a move were described by Nelms as being "early doors" in a video interview published on the club's website.

In May 2018, it was announced that the stadium would be renamed Kilmac Stadium at Dens Park for sponsorship reasons for the next two seasons. In October 2020, the club announced that Kilmac had extended its sponsorship for another year, again renaming the stadium to Kilmac Stadium.

Club staff

Corporate board

Management and staff

Players

First-team squad

On loan

Development squad

International players

Former and current players who have played at full international level while with the club, ordered by nationality and year of their debut:

  Argentina
 Claudio Caniggia (2000)

  Australia
 Mark Robertson (2001)

  Canada
 Chris Pozniak (2008)
 Marcus Haber (2016)

  China
 Fan Zhiyi (2001)

  Denmark
 Morten Wieghorst (1992)

  Finland
 Glen Kamara (2017)
 Benjamin Källman (2018)

  Georgia
 Georgi Nemsadze (2000)
 Temuri Ketsbaia (2001)
 Zurab Khizanishvili (2001)

 
 Mickaël Antoine-Curier (2008)

  Northern Ireland
 Sam Irving (1923)
 Billy Campbell (1967)
 Niall McGinn (2022)

  Poland
 Dariusz Adamczuk (1993)
 Piotr Czachowski (1994)

  Scotland
 Sandy Keillor (1894)
 William Longair (1894)
 Francis Barrett (1894)
 William Sawers (1895)
 Billy Thomson (1896)
 Bob Kelso (1896)

 Peter Robertson (1903)
 Sandy MacFarlane (1904)
 Jimmy Sharp (1904)
 Jack Fraser (1907)
 Willie Muir (1907)
 John Hunter (1907)
 George Chaplin (1908)
 Robert Hamilton (1911)
 Tom Kelso (1914)
 David Thomson (1920)
 Alex Troup (1920)
 John Gilmour (1930)
 Colin McNab (1931)
 James Robertson (1931)
 Doug Cowie (1945)
 Billy Steel (1952)
 Bill Brown (1958)
 Ian Ure (1962)
 Alex Hamilton (1962)
 Hugh Robertson (1962)
 Alan Gilzean (1964)
 Charlie Cooke (1965)
 Andy Penman (1966)
 George McLean (1968)
 Jocky Scott (1971)
 Thomson Allan (1974)
 Bobby Robinson (1974)
 Bobby Connor (1986)
 Gavin Rae (2001)
 Lee Wilkie (2002)

  Trinidad and Tobago
 Brent Sancho (2003)
 Kelvin Jack (2004)

  Venezuela
 Jonay Hernández (2002)

Hall of Fame

Legends Award
 Alan Gilzean (2009)
 Barry Smith (2009)
 Billy Steel (2009)
 Bobby Cox (2009)
 Doug Cowie (2009)
 Jocky Scott (2009)
 Alex Hamilton (2010)
 Gordon Wallace (2010)
 Jim Duffy (2010)
 Alan Cousin (2011)
 Andy Penman (2011)
 Ian Ure (2011)
 Pat Liney (2011)
 Tommy Coyne (2011)
 Bobby Seith (2012)
 Bobby Wishart (2012)
 Gordon Smith (2012)
 Hugh Robertson (2012)
 Alfie Boyd (2013)
 Bobby Glennie (2013)
 Bobby Wilson (2013)
 John Duncan (2015)
 Bill Brown (2015)

 Ally Donaldson (2016)
 Billy Pirie (2016)
 Neil McCann (2016)
Thomson Allan (2017)
Keith Wright (2017)
 Eric Sinclair (2018)
 Cammy Fraser (2018)
Tosh McKinlay (2019) 
George Stewart (2019)

Heritage Award
 William 'Plum' Longair (2009)
 Bob Shankly (2010)
 Tommy Gallacher (2011)
 George Anderson (2013)
 Sandy MacFarlane (2015)
 John 'Sailor' Hunter (2016)
Alec Troup (2017)
David 'Napper' Thomson (2018)
Albert Juliussen (2019)

Golden Era Award
Jimmy Toner (2016)
Alex Stuart (2017)
 Bobby Flavell (2018)

International Award
 Claudio Caniggia (2009)
 Georgi Nemsadze (2010)
 Jack Cowan (2013)
 Julián Speroni (2015)
Dariusz Adamczuk (2019)
Morten Wieghorst (2019)

Special Recognition Award
 Bobby Geddes (2016)

Modern Moment Award
 James Grady's goal against Dundee United at Tannadice in 1998-1999 season (2015)

Modern Heroes Award
Rab Douglas (2017)
 Gavin Rae (2018) 

Note: Year is year inducted into Hall of Fame

Managerial history

Player and young player of the year awards

Andrew De Vries Player of the Year

Neil McCann (1993–94)
George Shaw (1994–95)
George Shaw (1995–96)
Barry Smith (1996–97)
Rab Douglas (1997–98)
Dariusz Adamczuk (1998–99)
Willie Falconer (1999–00)
Claudio Caniggia (2000–01)
Temur Ketsbaia (2001–02)
Lee Wilkie (2002–03)
Nacho Novo (2003–04)
Steve Lovell (2004–05)
Bobby Mann (2005–06)
Kevin McDonald (2006–07)
Scott Robertson (2007–08)
Rab Douglas (2008–09)
Jim Lauchlan (2009–10)
Rab Douglas (2010–11)
Gary Irvine (2011–12)
Jim McAlister (2012–13)
Kyle Letheren (2013–14)
Scott Bain (2014–15)
Kane Hemmings (2015–16)
Cammy Kerr (2016–17)
Glen Kamara (2017–18)
Nathan Ralph (2018–19)
Paul McGowan (2019–20)
Lee Ashcroft (2020–21)
Ryan Sweeney (2021–22)

Isobel Sneddon Young Player of the Year
Cammy Kerr (2013–14)
Craig Wighton (2014–15)
Cammy Kerr (2015–16)
Cammy Kerr (2016–17)
Kerr Waddell (2017–18)
Callum Moore (2018–19)
Finlay Robertson (2019–20)
Max Anderson (2020–21)
Max Anderson (2021–22)

Rivalries 

Dundee's traditional rivals are Dundee United, with whom they compete in the Dundee derby. The rivalry is unique, as the two teams' stadiums are located within 100 yards of each other, making them the two closest League grounds in Britain. The close proximity of the two teams also fuels the intensity of the rivalry. This intensity makes it one of the most exciting and notable derbies in Scotland. While it is far friendlier than other Scottish derbies such as the Old Firm, both sets of fans regard the fixture to be of high importance, with derby results throughout the season being defining points in each teams' seasons.

Dundee traditionally dominated the fixture in its first few decades, but the momentum shifted in the 1980s, with United taking a foothold in the fixture. The history of late has been defined by the inability of both teams to consistently stay in the same division, with Dundee a division below United for quite a few seasons while dealing with the after-effects of multiple administrations. Dundee eventually returned to the Scottish Premiership in 2014, and in 2016 it was a Dundee derby victory over United that confirmed the latter's own relegation. After a few years of Dundee being a league above United, the two were eventually reunited again in the Scottish Championship in 2019 following Dundee's relegation.

Dundee and United also share a mutual rivalry with St Johnstone, due to the close proximity between Dundee and Perth, known as the Tayside derby. This fixture however is considered far less serious than the Dundee derby, though took prominence after United's relegation in 2016. The most notable fixture between the two occurred in 1962, where Dundee defeated St Johnstone 0–3 at the latter's former ground, Muirton Park. This result both confirmed Dundee as league champions for the first and to date only time in their history, and confirmed St Johnstone's relegation from the First Division.

Records
 Highest attendance: 136,495 fans attended the 1952 Scottish Cup Final between Dundee and Motherwell. This is also a record for a club match in Scotland not featuring either of the Old Firm.
 Highest home attendance: 43,024 vs Rangers, 7 February 1953, Scottish Cup second Round
 Highest average home attendance: 24,532, 1948–1949 (15 games)
 Biggest league win: 10–0 vs. Alloa Athletic 1947. vs. Dunfermline Athletic 1947
 Biggest league loss: 11–0 vs. Celtic 1895
 Most capped player: Alex Hamilton, 24, Scotland
 Most league appearances: Bill Marsh, 386, 1924–1937
 Most appearances: Doug Cowie, 445, 1945–1961
 Most league goals: Alan Gilzean, 113
 Most goals in a match: Albert Juliussen, 7 against Dunfermline 22 March 1947
Most goals in two consecutive matches Albert Juliussen: 13. Scoring 6 vs Alloa 6/3/47, and 7 vs Dunfermline 22/3/47
 Most goals in consecutive matches: Johnny Bell, 9 goals in 9 matches in 1920–1921 season
 Most league goals in a season: Dave Halliday, 38, 1923–1924
 Most league and cup goals in a season: Alan Gilzean, 52, 1963–1964
 Most games unbeaten: 23 (2 October 2010 – 26 March 2011)
 Highest transfer fee paid: £600,000, Fabián Caballero from Club Sol de América
 Highest transfer fee received: £1,500,000, Jack Hendry to Celtic
 Oldest Player: Bobby Geddes, 49 against Raith Rovers 21 April 2010
 Youngest Player: Andy Penman, 15 years 352 days against Hearts 7 February 1959
 Youngest Goalscorer: Craig Wighton, 16 years 105 days against Raith Rovers 9 November 2013

Honours

League

 Scottish Premiership:
 Winners (1): 1961–1962
 Runners-up (4): 1902–1903, 1906–1907, 1908–1909, 1948–1949
 Scottish Championship:
 Winners (5): 1946–1947, 1978–1979, 1991–1992, 1997–1998, 2013–2014
 Runners-up (5): 1980–1981, 2007–2008, 2009–2010, 2011–2012, 2020–2021

Domestic cups
Scottish Cup:
Winners (1): 1909–1910
Runners-up (4): 1924–1925, 1951–1952, 1963–1964, 2002–2003
Scottish League Cup:
Winners (3): 1951–1952, 1952–1953, 1973–1974
Runners-up (3): 1967–1968, 1980–1981, 1995–1996
Scottish Challenge Cup:
Winners (2): 1990–1991, 2009–2010
Runners-up (1): 1994–1995

Europe
European Cup:
Semi-finalists (1): 1962–1963
Inter-Cities Fairs Cup:
Semi-finalists (1): 1967–1968

Other
Forfarshire Cup:
Winners (28): 28 times
Scottish Youth Cup
Runners-up (3):  1987–1988, 1995–1996, 1998–1999
Evening Telegraph Challenge Cup:
Winners (1): 2006
Tennents' Sixes:
Winners (1): 1988
Finalists (1): 1984

Kit sponsors and manufacturers

References

External links

https://www.deearchive.co.uk/index.php
Satellite Photo of Dens Park and Tannadice
Dundee BBC My Club page
Dundee FC Supporters' Society Ltd.
Unofficial Dundee FC Forum.

 
Football clubs in Dundee
Football clubs in Scotland
Association football clubs established in 1893
1893 establishments in Scotland
Scottish Premier League teams
Scottish Football League teams
Scottish Cup winners
Scottish Challenge Cup winners
Scottish Professional Football League teams
Scottish League Cup winners
Companies that have entered administration in the United Kingdom